96 (ninety-six) is the natural number following 95 and preceding 97. It is a number that appears the same when turned upside down.

In mathematics
96 is:

 an octagonal number.
 a refactorable number.
 an untouchable number.
 a semiperfect number since it is a multiple of 6.
 an abundant number since the sum of its proper divisors is greater than 96.
 the fourth Granville number and the second non-perfect Granville number. The next Granville number is 126, the previous being 24.
 the sum of Euler's totient function φ(x) over the first seventeen integers.
 strobogrammatic in bases 10 (9610), 11 (8811) and 95 (1195).
 palindromic in bases 11 (8811), 15 (6615), 23 (4423), 31 (3331), 47 (2247) and 95 (1195).
 an Erdős–Woods number, since it is possible to find sequences of 96 consecutive integers such that each inner member shares a factor with either the first or the last member.
 divisible by the number of prime numbers (24) below 96.

Skilling's figure, a degenerate uniform polyhedron, has a Euler characteristic 

Every integer greater than 96 may be represented as a sum of distinct super-prime numbers.

In geography
 Ninety Six, South Carolina
 Ninety Six District, a historical judicial and military district of colonial America which extended through North and South Carolina
 Ninety Six National Historic Site, in Ninety Six, South Carolina, derives its name from the original settlement's distance in miles from a Cherokee village in the Blue Ridge Mountains

In music
 96Neko is a female Japanese singer
 The song "96 Tears" by garage rock band Question Mark and the Mysterians
 "96", a song by Uverworld, a Japanese band.
 "96 Quite Bitter Beings", a song recorded by rock band CKY
 "96 Degrees In The Shade", a song on an album with the same title (official song title "1865", recorded by Jamaican reggae band Third World.

In science
The atomic number of curium, an actinide.
 Messier 96, a magnitude 10.5 spiral galaxy in the constellation Leo
The New General Catalogue object NGC 96, a spiral galaxy in the constellation Andromeda

In other fields
 An Australian TV soap opera, Number 96 (broadcast 1972–1977)
A 1974 film based on the TV series, Number 96
 Class of '96 was a short-lived Fox drama series which aired in 1993
 96 dpi, the standard resolution of the monitor of an IBM-compatible computer running Microsoft Windows
 The number of surat Al-Alaq in the Qur'an
According to Gurdjieff's Fourth Way symbolism, the number of the Moon level
The 96th United States Congress met January 1979 to January 1981 during the last two years of President Jimmy Carter's administration
The 96th Infantry Division (United States) was a unit of the United States Army in World War II
 , a German U-boat during World War II and subject of the film Das Boot
 The Saab 96 car produced from 1960 to 1966
 STS-96, Space Shuttle Discovery mission launched May 27, 1999
 Mars 96 was a Russian orbiter launched in 1996
 The designation of American Interstate 96, a freeway in Michigan
 U.S. Route 96 is a north–south route in Texas 
 Four New York City Subway stops along 96th Street in Manhattan:
 96th Street (IRT Broadway – Seventh Avenue Line), serving the  trains
 96th Street (IND Eighth Avenue Line), serving the  trains
 96th Street (IRT Lexington Avenue Line), serving the  trains
 96th Street (IND Second Avenue Line); under construction
 96th Street (Manhattan)
  A warrior caste divided into 96 clans, Maratha
 96 was the number of deaths in the Hillsborough Disaster in Sheffield, England
 An Indian movie, '96 (film)

See also
 List of highways numbered 96

References

External links
 On the number 96

Integers